Armindo Ferreira (born January 31, 1976) is a retired professional footballer. He played as a winger and participated in the Coupe de France Final 2004 with LB Châteauroux.

External links
Armindo Ferreira profile at chamoisfc79.fr

1976 births
Living people
People from Niort
French footballers
Association football midfielders
LB Châteauroux players
Chamois Niortais F.C. players
Ligue 2 players
Sportspeople from Deux-Sèvres
Footballers from Nouvelle-Aquitaine